Kryts may refer to:

 Kryts people, of the Caucasus of Azerbaijan
 Kryts language, Lezgic language spoken by the Kryts people

Language and nationality disambiguation pages